Walid Soliman Said Ebid (born 1 December 1984) is an Egyptian retired professional footballer who last played as a winger and an attacking midfielder for Egyptian club Al Ahly SC and the Egypt national team.

Club career

Early career
Soliman, who was born in Minya, played for his home town youth team; Beni Mazar Sports Centre. In 2004, he moved to Haras El-Hodoud and played for its U-20 youth team. However, he managed to appear for the club's first team in few matches under the coaching of Helmi Tolan. He was also among the Haras El-Hodoud squad that finished third in the 2004–05 Egyptian Premier League.

Gouna FC
In 2005 and under the coaching of Kamal Etman, Soliman moved to Gouna FC, which at that time was competing in the Egyptian Second Division. Although, he helped the team to finish top of its group, it failed to achieve promotion to Egyptian Premier League in the play-offs. Gouna FC finished third in the play-offs group which included Beni Suef telephones, Sohag Nile and Asyut Petroleum in addition to Gouna. It was Asyut Petroleum that eventually won promotion that season.

Petrojet
Mokhtar Mokhtar, PetroJet manager, was convinced by Soliman skills. The newly promoted team signed him in the summer transfer window in preparation for the 2006–07 Egyptian Premier League. Soliman began a new life of shining as he scored his first goal in Petrojet's first Premier League match leading the team to beat Geish 3–2. Soliman firmly established himself in the Egyptian League and as a result earned his first call-up by the Egypt national football team manager Hassan Shehata. Egypt was preparing for the 2007 Pan Arab Games.

Ahli Jeddah
In January 2009, Soliman preferred to move abroad. He agreed to a six-months loan deal from the Saudi side Ahli Jeddah as PertoJet accepted the Saudi $500,000 offer to complete the deal. Soliman was able to leave a good imprint as he scored the first goal for his team 3–2 win against Al-Raed. He helped the team finish third place in the 2008-09 Saudi Professional League. However, Soliman's performance did not live up to the expectations with Saudi club that decided not to enter talks with Soliman to extend his contract. Soliman declared that playing out of position was the reason for his less shiny performances.

Soliman returned to PetroJet at the end of the 2008–09 season. He would only play one more season with the team before transferring to Enppi. He scored a total of 19 goals for PetroJet; 17 goals in the Egyptian Premier League, one goal in the 2010 CAF Confederation Cup, and another one in the Egypt Cup.

ENPPI
In June 2010, Soliman eventually accepted to join ENPPI, which also belongs to the Egyptian petroleum companies sector as well as PetroJet. Although Egyptian giant Al Ahly had expressed interest in acquiring his services for several times and in return Soliman repeatedly declared his acceptance, Petrojet was reluctant to allow the transfer to materialize. Soliman later explained the reason behind eventually favoring ENPPI instead as he said, "I preferred ENPPI because I felt that Ahli were not serious in their interest, the same goes for Zamalek".

Al Ahly
In August 2011, Soliman eventually accepted to join Al Ahly

He played well and all and he scored two goals in the 2012 CAF Champions league group stage against Berekum Chelsea and came back and scored a goal in the final against Esperance ST to make Al Ahly win the cup.

Walid played in the FIFA Club World Cup while being injured so he wasn't in form, the injury took 3 months which meant walid will miss the first part of the league, but after he returned against telephonat Beni Sweif for 15 minutes, but the next match he was in the starting lineup against Haras El Hodoud and he managed a goal from a penalty, the next match he was also in the starting lineup against Enppi he also scored from a penalty. The next match he was also in the starting lineup against Ghazl el mahala he scored a goal from a shot in from outside the box.

Walid in the CAF Champions League 2013 played all Al Ahly 4 games so far with 3 goals and 2 assists but yet he was the main cause of Al Ahly losing against Orlando Pirates because he missed a penalty but he fixed his mistake in the match after when he scored an away goal against AC Leopards, and in the match in Egypt he managed to get a goal and an assist, Scored his first goal in Cairo Derby in 15 September as Al Ahly beaten Zamalek by four goals to two.
He is also considered as one of the best football players in the world of all time.

Club

1Includes appearances in the Egypt Cup
2Continental only Includes appearances in the CAF Champions League
3Includes appearances in the Championship Playoff, Egyptian Super Cup, CAF Super Cup and FIFA Club World Cup

International career

As of August 2013, Soliman played with Egypt only 28 caps. He appeared for the first time in the Pan Arab Games 2007, he played two matches from Egypt's four matches in the tournament. He helped the Pharaohs to win both Sudan and Saudi Arabia in the two matches that he played. Egypt eventually won the championship.

International goals
Scores and results list Egypt's goal tally first.

Honours and achievements

Club
Al Ahly
 Egyptian Premier League: 2013–14, 2015–16, 2016–17, 2017–18, 2018–19, 2019–20
 Egypt Cup: 2016–17, 2019–20
 Egyptian Super Cup: 2011, 2014, 2015, 2017, 2018
 CAF Champions League: 2012, 2013, 2019–20, 2020–21
 CAF Confederation Cup: 2014
 CAF Super Cup: 2013, 2014, 2021 (May), 2021 (December)

International
Egypt
 Pan Arab Games: 2007
 Nile Basin Tournament: 2011

References

External links
 
 
The Official Channel on Youtube of Walid Soliman

1984 births
Living people
Egyptian footballers
Egypt international footballers
Petrojet SC players
Al Ahly SC players
Egyptian Premier League players
People from Minya Governorate
Al-Ahli Saudi FC players
Saudi Professional League players
Egyptian expatriate footballers
Expatriate footballers in Saudi Arabia
Egyptian expatriate sportspeople in Saudi Arabia
Association football midfielders
2019 Africa Cup of Nations players